Charles Woolsey Cole (February 8, 1906 – February 20, 1978) was an American diplomat and academic who served as the twelfth president of Amherst College from 1946 to 1960.

Biography
Cole was also involved with the Committee on the National Security Organization, American Cancer Society, U.S. Air Force, Merrill Foundation for the Advancement of Financial Knowledge, Educational Testing Service, and Teachers Insurance and Annuity Association.

Charles W. Cole attended Amherst College and was a brother of the Delta Kappa Epsilon fraternity (Sigma chapter).

Cole received his master's degree and Ph.D. from Columbia University. He was then a history professor at Columbia. From 1961 to 1964 he was United States Ambassador to Chile.

See also
John William Ward

References

External links
 
 Charles W. Cole (AC 1927) Papers at the Amherst College Archives & Special Collections

1906 births
1978 deaths
Ambassadors of the United States to Chile
Columbia University faculty
Columbia University alumni
Amherst College alumni
Presidents of Amherst College
20th-century American academics